Mooru Janma is a 1984 Indian Kannada-language film,  directed by H. R. Bhargava and produced by S. N. Parthanath Brothers. The film stars Ambareesh, Ambika, Anuradha and Lokesh. The film has musical score by Rajan–Nagendra. The movie is based on the novel of same name, by T. K. Rama Rao.

Cast

Ambareesh
Ambika (Voice dubbed by B. Jayashree)
Anuradha
Lokesh
Sudarshan
Jai Jagadish
Dinesh
Sudheer
Rajaram
Vijayakashi
Mysore Lokesh
Phani Ramachandra
Thimmayya
Master Manjunath
Thoogudeepa Srinivas
Chethan Ramarao
Shashikala
Shanthamma

Soundtrack
The music was composed by Rajan–Nagendra.

References

External links
 

1984 films
1980s Kannada-language films
Films scored by Rajan–Nagendra
Films based on Indian novels
Films directed by H. R. Bhargava